Burbank High School may refer to the following American schools:

Burbank High School (Burbank, California), Burbank, California
Luther Burbank High School (California), Sacramento, California
Luther Burbank High School (Texas), San Antonio, Texas

See also
Luther Burbank Middle School (disambiguation)
Burbank Elementary School (disambiguation)